The 1929 Santa Clara Broncos football team was an American football team that represented Santa Clara University as an independent during the 1929 college football season.  In their first season under head coach Maurice J. "Clipper" Smith, the Broncos compiled a 5–3 record and outscored opponents by a total of 123 to 67.

Schedule

References

Santa Clara
Santa Clara Broncos football seasons
Santa Clara Broncos football